Almut is feminine German given name. Notable people with the name include:

Almut Brömmel (born 1935), German javelin and discus thrower
Almut Kemperdick (born 1963), German volleyball player
Almut Lehmann (born 1953), German pair skater

German feminine given names